Gunship! is a video game developed by MicroProse and published by Hasbro Interactive for Windows in April 2000. It's the third game in the Gunship series following Gunship (1986) and Gunship 2000 (1991). Hasbro announced in late 1999 that it would discontinue the development of military simulations. Gunship! was the last game in that genre from MicroProse.

Gameplay
Gunship! is a game in which the player can pilot three helicopters: Boeing AH-64 Apache (also the British variant AgustaWestland Apache), Eurocopter Tiger, and Mil Mi-28.

Reception

Computer Gaming Worlds Jeff Lackey summarized the game as: "It's a shame that GUNSHIP! is plagued with broken commands and bad design choices, because underneath it all beats the heart of a potentially-fun arcade chopper sim. The battlefield action is fast and furious, with a war going on around you as artillery support is called in, ground units clash, armor pops smoke to hide, and so on. And the terrain is really beautiful. But unless the game is patched to fix some of its more grievous issues, it's impossible to recommend GUNSHIP! to anyone."

GameSpot's Bruce Geryk said that "Despite its intermittent bugs, Gunship! isn't a bad game if you just want to fly (to use the term loosely) around and cause explosions.

GameSpy's Doug Farmer summarized that: "With Gunship! Microprose has once once again pushed the envelope on combat attack helicopter simulators. By combining realistic fun with hard core real time strategy they've created an experience that's bound to appeal to nearly every flight sim fan out there."

IGN's Rich Rouse said: "[...] Gunship! is pretty much everything we hoped it would be. There's enough action in this box to make it more than worth the buy for any sim enthusiast who's been looking for the right copter to fly."

PC Gamer's Stephen Poole said that Gunship! is "a buggy, spiritless game that earns the distinction of disappointing both hardcore simmers and casual gamers."

References

External links

2000 video games
Combat flight simulators
Hasbro games
Helicopter video games
MicroProse games
Multiplayer and single-player video games
Video games developed in the United States
Windows games
Windows-only games